The GER Class T18 was a class of fifty  steam locomotives designed by James Holden for the Great Eastern Railway.  They passed to the London and North Eastern Railway at the grouping in 1923 and received the LNER classification J66.

Overview

They were rebuilt between 1898 and 1908.

Withdrawals started in 1936 when four (7278, 7287, 7303 and 7308) were sold to Sir Robert McAlpine and Son, the latter concern also having five on loan from late 1936 to mid-1938. Three others were sold, with No. 297 going to the Mersey Railway in 1939 as their No. 3 to work ballast trains. By the end of 1940, thirty-one had been withdrawn, and the remaining 19 locomotives continued with no further retirements until 1950. In the LNER 1944 renumbering plan, the locomotives were renumbered 8370–8388. Withdrawal restarted in 1950 and all were gone by the end of 1955. 

In 1952, three locomotives, 8370 and 8378, and 8382 were transferred to the service list as 32, 36, and 31 respectively.

References

Notes

Bibliography

External links

  — Great Eastern Railway Society
 The Holden J66 (GER Class T18) 0-6-0T Locomotives — LNER Encyclopedia

T18
0-6-0T locomotives
Railway locomotives introduced in 1886
Standard gauge steam locomotives of Great Britain
Scrapped locomotives